Pterobunocephalus is a genus of banjo catfishes found in tropical South America.

Distribution
The genus is widespread in the Orinoco, Amazon and Paraguay-Paraná River systems and typically occur at depths greater than 5 metres.

Description
Pterobunocephalus is genus of small to medium-sized aspredinid species. Members of this genus are distinguished from all other aspredinids by the following characters having an extremely depressed (flattened) head and body, having the head ornamentation highly reduced or absent, often having a distinct notch in the upper jaw, and having 10–20 anal fin rays. Females of this genus carry embryos directly attached to the ventral surface of their bodies, which also distinguishes them from all other aspredinids.

Species 
There are currently two described species in this genus:
 Pterobunocephalus depressus (Haseman, 1911)
 Pterobunocephalus dolichurus (Delsman, 1941)

References

External links

Aspredinidae
Fish of South America
Fish of the Amazon basin
Fauna of Brazil
Fauna of Peru
Catfish genera
Taxa named by Henry Weed Fowler